Zalman Grinberg (September 29, 1912 – August 8, 1983) was a medical doctor who served as the chairman for the Central Committee of Liberated Jews in the American sector of Germany and Austria after World War II.

Early life
Zalman Grinberg was born on September 4, 1912 in Lithuania. He was educated as a medical doctor with a specialty in radiology. He was imprisoned in the concentration camp at Dachau.

Career
Shortly after the war, Zalman led a group of 800 nearly dead Dachau prisoners in search of help, eventually finding himself near the monastery of St. Ottilien. There, managed to set up a hospital at the monastery, recruiting nurses and physicians among the concentration camp survivors.

Subsequently, he was appointed to the Central Committee ("ZK"), which was seated in Munich. He moved to Israel and became the director of the Beilinson Hospital in Petah Tikva. He emigrated to the United States in 1955, where he became a psychiatrist.

Personal life
He was married to Eva Klein. They had three sons, Yair, Moshe and Raffi.

Death
He died in Mineola, New York.

References

1912 births
1983 deaths
Physicians from Kaunas
Dachau concentration camp survivors
Displaced persons camps in the aftermath of World War II
American psychiatrists
20th-century Israeli Jews
Israeli radiologists
Lithuanian emigrants to Israel
Lithuanian Jews
Israeli emigrants to the United States
Jews from the Russian Empire